Zinc finger FYVE-type containing 28 is a protein that in humans is encoded by the ZFYVE28 gene.

References

Further reading